HMS Firedrake was an F-class destroyer built for the Royal Navy during the early 1930s. Although assigned to the Home Fleet upon completion, the ship was attached to the Mediterranean Fleet in 1935–36 during the Abyssinia Crisis. During the Spanish Civil War of 1936–39, she spent much time in Spanish waters, enforcing the arms blockade imposed by Britain and France on both sides of the conflict.

Several weeks after the start of the Second World War in September 1939, Firedrake helped to sink a German submarine and took part in the Norwegian Campaign in early 1940. She was sent to Gibraltar in mid-1940 and formed part of Force H where she escorted many Malta convoys in the Mediterranean and helped to sink an Italian submarine. Firedrake participated in the Battle of Cape Spartivento and screened the capital ships of Force H as they bombarded Genoa before she was damaged by an Italian bomb in mid-1941. After her repairs were completed the ship became a convoy escort in the Atlantic at the beginning of 1942. Firedrake was torpedoed and sunk by a German U-boat in December 1942 with the loss of most of her crew.

Description
The F-class ships were repeats of the preceding E-class. They were powered by two Parsons geared steam turbines, each driving one propeller shaft, using steam provided by three Admiralty three-drum boilers. Firedrake barely exceeded her designed speed during her sea trials. The ships' complement was 145 officers and ratings.

The ships mounted four 4.7-inch (120 mm) Mark IX guns in single mounts, designated 'A', 'B', 'X', and 'Y' in sequence from front to rear. For anti-aircraft (AA) defence, they had two quadruple Mark I mounts for the 0.5 inch Vickers Mark III machine gun. The F class was fitted with two above-water quadruple torpedo tube mounts for  torpedoes. One depth charge rack and two throwers were fitted; 20 depth charges were originally carried, but this increased to 35 shortly after the war began.

Wartime modifications
By October 1940, Firedrake had her rear torpedo tube mount replaced by a 12-pounder AA gun. While the ship was under repair in late 1941, 'Y' gun had was removed to allow a total of 70 depth charges to be stowed aboard. Several other changes also probably happened during this refit, notably two single  Oerlikon light AA guns were installed abreast the bridge and a Type 286 short-range surface search radar was fitted as was a HF/DF radio direction finder mounted on a pole mainmast.

Construction and career
Firedrake, the sixth ship of her name in the Royal Navy, was built by Parsons Marine Steam Turbine Company, Wallsend, although her hull was sub-contracted to Vickers Armstrongs. She was laid down at their Walker, Newcastle upon Tyne shipyard on 5 July, launched on 28 June 1934, the same day as her sister ship, and completed on 30 April 1935. The ship cost 243,966 pounds, excluding government-furnished equipment like the armament. Firedrake was initially assigned to the 6th Destroyer Flotilla (DF) of the Home Fleet, but was sent to reinforce the Mediterranean Fleet, together with most of her sisters, during the Abyssinian crisis, in September and remained there until December. Firedrake was refitted at Gibraltar from 14 December 1935 to 11 February 1936. She briefly returned home to give leave to the crew later that month, but she returned to the Mediterranean in March and remained there until July when she began a refit at Sheerness Dockyard.

Upon its completion on 30 September, the ship returned to the Mediterranean and began to enforce the arms embargo imposed on both sides in the Spanish Civil War by the Non-Intervention Committee until June 1937. On 23 April 1937, Firedrake, together with the battlecruiser , escorted a British merchantman into Bilbao harbour despite the presence of the Nationalist cruiser  that attempted to blockade the port. Firedrake returned to Gibraltar in September and resumed patrols in Spanish waters until November when she began another refit at Sheerness that lasted until 30 December. The ship spent another two months at Gibraltar between January and March 1938 and then patrolled the Spanish coastline in the Bay of Biscay a year later. The 6th DF was renumbered the 8th Destroyer Flotilla in April 1939, five months before the start of World War II. Firedrake remained assigned to it until June 1940, escorting the larger ships of the fleet.

World War II
In September 1939 Firedrake was assigned to the Home Fleet and based at Scapa Flow. In the first month of hostilities she was part of an anti-submarine hunting group centred on the aircraft carrier . On 5 October, the ship rescued survivors from the small freighter . In February 1940, she was one of the escorts for Convoy TC 3 carrying troops from Canada to the UK. Firedrake was slightly damaged going alongside the destroyer  at Invergordon on 28 March and was repaired between 2 and 26 April at Cardiff, Wales.

In the Norwegian Campaign, she supported the Allied landings on 12–13 May at Bjerkvik during the Battle of Narvik. The ship continued to provide fire support during the battle for the rest of the month. During the nights of 30 and 31 May, Firedrake helped to evacuate troops from Bodø to Harstad and Borkenes to await further evacuation. She was one of the ships that escorted the troop ships evacuating the troops from the Narvik area on 7 and 8 June. She was slightly damaged by splinters during an aerial attack on 23 May and again on 12 June when her port steering motor and 'A' gun were knocked out of action; her repairs were completed eight days later.

Firedrake was briefly assigned to the 4th Destroyer Flotilla until she rejoined the 8th DF in mid-August as they escorted the battleship  and the new carrier  from the UK to Gibraltar, arriving on 29 August. The next day, Fury and Force H covered the passage of Valiant and Illustrious through the Western Mediterranean to rendezvous with the Mediterranean Fleet (Operation Hats). A boarding party captured cipher and operational documents aboard the boat which led to the sinking of the  two days later. Between them, the two destroyers rescued 5 officers and 43 ratings. Firedrake escorted the carriers  and Ark Royal during Operations Coat and White in November as they flew off aircraft for Malta. The ship escorted Force F to Malta during Operation Collar later in the month and participated in the inconclusive Battle of Cape Spartivento on 27 November, where she was part of the screen for the battlecruiser  and the battleship .

On 1 January 1941, Firedrake was one of the ships that intercepted a Vichy French convoy off Mellila, Morocco and seized all four merchant ships of the convoy. Later that month, she was involved in Operation Excess. On 31 January 1941, Force H departed Gibraltar to carry out Operation Picket, an unsuccessful night torpedo attack by eight of Ark Royals Fairey Swordfish on the Tirso Dam in Sardinia. The British ships returned to Gibraltar on 4 February and began preparing for Operation Grog, a naval bombardment of Genoa, that was successfully carried out five days later. The destroyer accidentally ran aground in fog near Gibraltar on 1 March and received preliminary repairs there until 21 April. Final repairs were completed at Chatham Royal Dockyard on 19 June and she rejoined the 8th DF back at Gibraltar shortly afterwards.

During Operation Substance, Firedrake and Foxhound were each leading a column of the convoy, streaming their TSDS minesweeps, through the Sicilian Narrows on 23 July when an Italian  bomb near missed Firedrake and detonated off her port side. The shockwave blew in the plating over No. 1 boiler room and disabled her so that she had to be towed back to Gibraltar by the destroyer . Temporary repairs were made in Gibraltar and she was transferred to the Boston Navy Yard for repair on 23 September. Firedrake exchanged one 4.7-inch gun for additional depth charges while under repair to better suit her new role as a convoy escort.

After escorting Convoy NA 2 to the UK in January 1942, the ship was assigned to Escort Group B7 of the Mid-Ocean Escort Force. While escorting Convoy ON(S) 94 in May, the escorts drove off . Firedrake received repairs in April on the Clyde and August in Belfast. She rescued survivors from the torpedoed merchantman  on 26 September. Two months later, the ship was detached to reinforce the escort for Convoy ON 144 on 18 November and helped to prevent any further losses to the convoy. She broke in two; the bow section sinking immediately at coordinates , but the stern stayed afloat until 00:45. The corvette  picked up 26 survivors, but the rest of her crew of 140 men were lost.

In media
Stock footage of HMS Firedrake (H79) was featured in the movie The Spy in Black (1939)

References

Bibliography

External links
 HMS Firedrake Association website
 HMS Firedrake at Naval-History.net

 

E and F-class destroyers of the Royal Navy
Ships built on the River Tyne
1934 ships
World War II destroyers of the United Kingdom
Ships sunk by German submarines in World War II
Maritime incidents in December 1942
World War II shipwrecks in the Atlantic Ocean